Dipyramid is a pair of mountain peaks in Juneau City and Borough, Alaska, United States. It is a part of the Boundary Ranges of the Coast Mountains in western North America.

Dipyramid was named by the Juneau Icefield Research Project in 1964, published by the United States Geological Survey in 1966, and entered into the Survey's Geographic Names Information System on January 1, 2000.

One of two August 1999 collections of seismic data on the nearby Demorest Glacier was conducted near Dipyramid.

References

External links
Sketch of Dipyramid by Maria Coryell-Martin

Mountains of Alaska
Boundary Ranges
Mountains of Juneau, Alaska